Ognjen Sviličić (born 1971 in Split) is a screenwriter and film director, based in Berlin noted for his critically acclaimed 2007 films Sorry For Kung Fu, Armin and These Are the Rules

Career

Sviličić was born 1971 in Split, in a family of journalists. He started his career with a series of TV features which had a mixed critical response. At the beginning of the 2000s, Sviličić often worked as a co-writer or script doctor on films by other directors (What Iva Recorded by Tomislav Radić, The Melon Route by Branko Schmidt). Many of the directors with whom he worked made significantly better films than usual while co-working with Sviličić. Sviličić was therefore sometimes nicknamed "Mabuse of Croatian cinema", who "resurrects [directors] from the dead".

Sviličić's first international success was comedy Sorry for Kung Fu, in which young woman from the Dalmatian highlands comes back from Germany to her native village. Girl (Daria Lorenci) is pregnant, but does not reveal the identity of the father. Their old-fashioned parents try to find a husband for her, but she stubbornly refuses. The film was screened in a Forum program of Berlinale.

Sviličić's next film, Armin, was also screened in Berlin Forum. That is the story about a teenage musician and his simpleton father who travel from Bosnia to Zagreb to audition for a German coproduction film. Son is skeptical and bitter, and father is naive and overtly enthusiastic for anything that is "Western" and "European".

His next internationally recognised film was These Are the Rules, premiered on Venice, Orrizonti section where it won the award for the best actor.

Sviličić is continually working as a script writer, he wrote the script for "The Father" together with director Srdan Golubović (Premiere Berlinale 2020, Panorama audience award).

He was working as a script consultant for many European script development platforms like First Film First, EAVE or Nipkow Program

Sviličić signed the Declaration on the Common Language of the Croats, Serbs, Bosniaks and Montenegrins.

Filmography
 Wish I Were a Shark (Da mi je biti morski pas) (1999) - writer and director
 Sorry for Kung Fu (Oprosti za kung fu) (2004) - writer and director
 What Iva Recorded (Što je Iva snimila 21. listopada 2003.) (2005) - writer
 The Melon Route (Put lubenica) (2006) - writer
 Armin (2007) - writer and director
 Metastases (2009) - writer
 Two Sunny Days (2010) - writer and director
 These Are the Rules (2014) - writer and director
 We Will Be the World Champions (2015) - writer
 The Voice (2019) - writer and director
 Father (2020) - writer

References

External links

Ognjen Sviličić at film.hr 
Ognjen Sviličić at hrfilm.hr 

Croatian film directors
Croatian screenwriters
Living people
1971 births
Film people from Split, Croatia
Golden Arena winners
Vladimir Nazor Award winners
Signatories of the Declaration on the Common Language